Wimborne is a market town in Dorset, England, more formally known as Wimborne Minster.

As such, it may also refer to:
 Wimborne Market, a market in Wimborne Minster
 Wimborne Minster (church), the parish church of Wimborne Minster, itself also called Wimborne Minster
 Wimborne Minster astronomical clock, a 14th-century astronomical clock inside the church of Wimborne Minster
 Wimborne Minster Folk Festival, an annual folk festival held in Wimborne Minster
 Wimborne Model Town, a model town in Wimborne Minster
 Wimborne railway station, the former railway station in Wimborne Minster
 Wimborne Town F.C., an association football club in Wimborne Minster

Deriving from the town in Dorset, it may also refer to:
 Viscount Wimborne
 Ivor Guest, 1st Baron Wimborne
 Lady Wimborne Bridge, named after the wife of the 1st Baron
 Ivor Guest, 1st Viscount Wimborne, son of the 1st Baron
 Ivor Grosvenor Guest, 2nd Viscount Wimborne, son of the 1st Viscount
 Ivor Guest, 3rd Viscount Wimborne, son of the 2nd Viscount
 Ivor Guest, 4th Viscount Wimborne, son of the 3rd Viscount

Wimborne may also refer to:

 Wimborne St Giles, a village in Dorset, seven miles from Wimborne Minster
 Wimborne St Giles Hundred, a former hundred in Dorset
 Wimborne Road Cemetery, Bournemouth, a cemetery in Bournemouth, Dorset
 Wimborne, Alberta, a hamlet in Alberta, Canada